Ahmed Hamdi Hussein Hafez (born 10 February 1998) is an Egyptian professional footballer who plays as an attacking midfielder for Major League Soccer club CF Montréal.

Career
Hamdy is a product of the Al Ahly youth system. On 18 December 2015, he made his debut with Al-Ahly in a 2015–16 Egyptian Premier League match against Smouha SC under José Peseiro. He started the match before being substituted in the second half.

On 4 February 2021, Hamdy joined Canadian Major League Soccer club CF Montréal on loan for the 2021 season. On 19 October 2021, Montréal announced they had exercised their purchase option on Hamdy.

Honours
Montreal Impact
 Canadian Championship: 2021

References

1998 births
Egyptian footballers
Living people
Footballers from Cairo
Al Ahly SC players
CF Montréal players
Egyptian Premier League players
Association football midfielders
Expatriate footballers in Egypt
Egyptian expatriate footballers
Major League Soccer players
Egypt under-20 international footballers